Simon Drake (born 1975) is an Australian writer of science fiction and non-fiction.

Biography
Simon Drake was born in Brisbane, Australia. In 1998 he lived in Sydney, and then in 2003 moved to live in Berlin, Germany. In 2004 he moved to London and wrote "The Art of Office War". Double Dragon Publishing released his first science fiction novel "Love Data", followed by "10,000BC - The First Geniuses".
In response to the financial crisis, and during the height of the international bailout process, he wrote "The Bankers Who Sold the World", which was published in 2009.
Simon Drake currently lives in Frankfurt am Main, Germany.

List of major works
 The Art of Office War, 2006
 Love Data, 2007
 10,000BC - The First Geniuses, 2008
 Generous Enemies, 2008
 The Return of the Last Space Explorer, 2008
 The Bankers Who Sold the World, 2009

External links
"The Australian Times" interview with Simon Drake, 2008
Double Dragon, Publisher of "Love Data" and "10,000BC - The First Geniuses"
"The Art of Office War" published in Poland by OnePress under the title "Sztuka wojny biurowej"
Official website for "The Art of Office War"
Fan page for "The Bankers Who Sold the World

1975 births
Living people
21st-century Australian novelists
Australian male novelists
Australian science fiction writers
Australian expatriates in Germany
Australian expatriates in England
Writers from Brisbane
21st-century Australian male writers